Poul Peter Popiel (born February 28, 1943) is a Danish-American former professional ice hockey defenceman who played in the National Hockey League (NHL) and World Hockey Association (WHA), and also served as a head coach in the minor leagues. Following a brief 12 games in the International Hockey League (IHL) with the Muskegon Mohawks, he retired and became the head coach. Popiel and Garry Peters were co-winners of the inaugural Ken McKenzie Trophy as Central Professional Hockey League rookies of the year in 1963-64. His younger brother Jan Popiel is also a former professional hockey player.

Popiel was the first Danish-born player in the National Hockey League. Popiel's family moved to Canada in 1951 when he was a child, and subsequently moved to the United States and he acquired American citizenship before making his NHL debut.

Awards
Ken McKenzie Trophy
Played in WHA All-Star Game (1974, 1975, 1977)

Career statistics

Coaching statistics

References

External links

1943 births
Boston Bruins players
Buffalo Bisons (AHL) players
Cleveland Barons (1937–1973) players
Danish emigrants to Canada
People from Lolland Municipality
People from Lolland
Danish ice hockey defencemen
Detroit Red Wings players
Edmonton Oilers players
Hershey Bears players
Houston Aeros (WHA) players
Houston Apollos players
Ice hockey people from Ontario
Living people
Los Angeles Kings players
Muskegon Mohawks players
People from Halton Hills
Rochester Americans players
Springfield Kings players
Vancouver Canucks players
Sportspeople from Region Zealand